Esther Ene Audu (born March 22, 1982) is a Nigerian actress. She is popularly known for starring in the films Inikpi, Dinner (2016), Mystified (2017), and Order of the Ring (2013).

Early life and education 
Esther Audu was born on the 22nd of March 1982 in Ikeja Lagos into the family of Mr. James Audu, a retired Military officer who served most of his service in Lagos and lived at the Ikeja Military Cantonment where Audu was born and her five other siblings. Audu is the youngest of six children of her family who were originally from Olamaboro of Kogi State, she had her primary and junior secondary schools in Lagos. In 2002, their family left Lagos for Abuja, and in Abuja, she completed her secondary school education and then secured admission to study Business Management at the University of Jos, Plateau State in 2006, she then graduated with a BA Business Management in 2010. She is married to Philip Ojire a video director.

Career 
Esther started her acting career since when in secondary school; she said to be a newscaster was her dream. At secondary school she was a member of Drama and Literary clubs where she participated in stage dramas. However, in 1996, she was among those selected to represent Nigeria at kidafest in Ghana, from there her passion for acting start to grow and dropping her dream of being a newscaster. She first starred in a lead movie role entitled: Ungodly romance and Sins of Rachael in Jos by Alex Mouth which she said were the earliest movies that helped launched her career fully into Nollywood. However, Audu an undergraduate was still participating in movies while studying, she featured in a movie entitled: Fatal Mistake  Norbert Ajagu, in a sub lead role.

Personal life 
Esther is married to Philip Ojire a serial entrepreneur and the founder of shirt freak .

Filmography

Awards and nominations

References

External links
 

1982 births
Living people
University of Jos alumni
Actresses from Lagos State
20th-century Nigerian actresses
21st-century Nigerian actresses
Nigerian film actresses